"The Remedy (I Won't Worry)" is the debut single of American singer-songwriter Jason Mraz from his debut album, Waiting for My Rocket to Come (2002). Written by Mraz and production team the Matrix (Lauren Christy, Scott Spock, and Graham Edwards), the song is about a good friend of Mraz's, Charlie Mingroni, being struck with cancer and how it changed Mraz's outlook on life. Occasionally, while performing this song during his shows, Mraz would include a singalong with the audience to Oasis's "Wonderwall".

Released on January 27, 2003, this song was Mraz's first top-40 hit, reaching number 15 on the US Billboard Hot 100. He would not have a second until 2008's "I'm Yours." Outside the United States, the song reached number 32 in New Zealand and became a minor hit in Australia, the Netherlands, and the United Kingdom.

Music video
The video, directed by Dean Karr, starts with Jason Mraz performing a concert. He then walks (in dog slippers) on some sort of farm. He then grabs a set of car keys and gets in his "Mrazda" (1962 Buick LeSabre 4 door hardtop).  He then calls a whole bunch of roosters to get in the car. He pulls away from the farm and begins to drive through a neighborhood. He continues to perform on stage. He then walks on a sidewalk, where he makes eye contact with a girl holding a basket of eggs. The girl slips on a banana peel and drops all of the eggs. He continues to walk on the sidewalk. While walking, he grabs a flower from the ground and slips the flower into the barrel of a soldier's gun. He then runs into two twin boys and he lets them try on his red hat. He continues to perform and the camera switches back and forth between all previous shots. The video ends with him getting out of his car and he tips his hat towards the camera.

Track listings

UK CD single
 "The Remedy (I Won't Worry)" (radio edit) – 3:22
 "Tonight, Not Again" (live) – 4:24
 "The Remedy (I Won't Worry)" (live) – 3:48

UK 7-inch single
A. "The Remedy (I Won't Worry)" (radio edit) – 3:22
B. "Tonight, Not Again" (live) – 4:24

Australian CD single
 "The Remedy (I Won't Worry)" (album version)
 "Tonight, Not Again" (live)
 "Curbside Prophet" (live)
 "The Remedy (I Won't Worry)" (live)

Credits and personnel
Credits are taken from the UK CD single liner notes and the Waiting for My Rocket to Come album booklet.

Studios
 Mixed at The Crabtrap (Easton, Maryland)
 Engineered at Dragonfly Studios (Haymarket, Virginia) and The Crabtrap (Easton, Maryland)
 Mastered at Sterling Sound (New York City)

Personnel

 Jason Mraz – music, lyrics, vocals, backing vocals, acoustic guitars
 Lauren Christy – music, lyrics
 Scott Spock – music, lyrics
 Graham Edwards – music, lyrics
 Toca Rivera – backing vocals
 Michael Andrews – acoustic guitar, electric guitar
 John Alagía – electric guitar, Wurlitzer, shaker, tambourine, production, mixing
 Stewart Myers – bass
 Greg Kurstin – electric piano, electric organ, synthesizer
 Brian Jones – drums
 Chris Keup – preproduction, arrangement assistance
 Jeff Juliano – mixing, engineering
 Peter Harding – second engineer
 Ted Jensen – mastering

Charts

Weekly charts

Year-end charts

Certifications

Release history

References

2002 songs
2003 debut singles
Elektra Records singles
Jason Mraz songs
Songs written by Jason Mraz
Songs written by Graham Edwards (musician)
Songs written by Lauren Christy
Songs written by Scott Spock
Songs about cancer